Battle Studies is the fourth studio album by American singer-songwriter John Mayer, released on November 17, 2009, by Columbia Records. Production took place from February to August 2009 at Battle Studies recording studio in Calabasas, California, Capitol Studios in Hollywood, and The Village in West Los Angeles, California, and was handled by Mayer and Steve Jordan.

The album debuted at number one on the US Billboard 200, selling over 286,000 copies in its first week of sales. It achieved successful sales in several other countries and produced two singles that attained chart success. Battle Studies received positive reviews from critics, and was certified platinum by the Recording Industry Association of America, having sold over 880,000 copies in the United States.

Background
After the overwhelming success of Continuum, Mayer confessed to being intimidated about starting on a new album; however, he did not want too much time to pass without making new music. Speaking on his motivation to move on, he said, "I think it got a lot easier when I realised that no matter what I do, it's not going to be Continuum, good or bad. And then that became really liberating." On October 1, 2009, Mayer posted via Twitter: "Track listing on Battle Studies is complete! Very interesting order... 11 songs. 45 minutes. Hit 'em hard and get out."

The album was leaked just hours before Mayer was scheduled to perform an official "radio leak" on 103.7 Sophie in San Diego. However, Mayer gave his listeners permission to download the leak, as long as they "registered" their copies by ordering the album.

Mayer's 2010 Battle Studies World Tour began on February 4, 2010, in Sunrise, Florida at the BB&T Center, and ended on October 1, 2010, in Manila, Philippines, at SM Mall of Asia.

Singles
According to Mayer's official Twitter profile, "Who Says" was the first single from the album and was released for preview on September 25, 2009, at www.johnmayer.com. The official release for the single was on October 13, 2009.

The second single was "Heartbreak Warfare", which was previewed on October 19, 2009. The first ever augmented reality video accompanied the second single, which was released on Mayer's website.

The third single was "Half of My Heart", which was released for radio airplay on June 21, 2010.

The fourth single was "Perfectly Lonely", which was released on November 13, 2010.

Critical reception

Battle Studies received generally positive reviews from music critics. At Metacritic, which assigns a normalized rating out of 100 to reviews from mainstream critics, the album received an average score of 64, based on 17 reviews. 

Mojo complimented its musical "breadth" and said that the playing is "unfussily superb throughout". AllMusic's Stephen Thomas Erlewine commended Mayer for his musicianship, despite a reliance on "texture". The Boston Globes Sarah Rodman wrote that he "continues to strip away the twinkly radio lacquer of his earlier work without sacrificing his pop sensibilities". Jackie Hayden of Hot Press called it a "classy pop opus for grown-ups". Although he felt the album lacked depth, Alex Silveri of 

Sputnikmusic commended Mayer's "knack for dealing with universal themes in thoroughly down to earth ways, and without the layering of pop cheese that so many of his contemporaries indulge in". Leah Greenblatt of Entertainment Weekly called the album "an expertly calibrated study in soft-pedal confessions, searching lyricism, and mildly groovy guitar licks." MSN Music's Robert Christgau gave the album a two-star honorable mention. He cited "War of My Life" and "Perfectly Lonely" as highlights and quipped, "Same kind of problems as Ben Gibbard, only more concise about them (which doesn't necessarily mean smarter, y'know)".

In a mixed review, Andy Gill of The Independent found Mayer's lyrics "ultimately tiresome". Randy Lewis of the Los Angeles Times said that, "for the most part, he expresses himself more eloquently through his guitar than his lyrics". Chicago Sun-Times critic Jim DeRogatis found the album "laden with laughable romantic-schlock lyrics and trite, sappy melodies". Tom Hughes of The Guardian wrote that "Mayer's talents are obvious, but there's so much more cheese than charm here that he would seem like a hard sell outside the Billboard heartland". Darren Jamison of Singersroom placed it 60 in the list of 100 greatest albums of 2009, describing the album as a reflection on the ups and downs of relationships.  

The Village Voice columnist Zach Baron stated that it "somehow avoids including any of the myriad things that actually make John Mayer interesting". Jon Caramanica of The New York Times wrote that "the album highlights the extremely blatant chasm between John Mayer the musician and John Mayer the public character, a divide Mr. Mayer said he was eager to maintain". Edna Gundersen of USA Today stated that "there's seldom a cease-fire during Mayer's earnest, solemn musings on romance. While his guitar chops are impeccable on this well-crafted blues-pop album, the gravity and cautious noodling cry out for some input from that other Mayer: his cunning, irreverent public persona."

Accolades
The album received a Grammy Award nomination for Best Pop Vocal Album but lost to Lady Gaga's The Fame Monster, while "Half of My Heart" was nominated for Best Male Pop Vocal Performance but lost to Bruno Mars' "Just the Way You Are".

Commercial performance
The album debuted at number one on the US Billboard 200 chart and sold 286,000 copies in its first week. In its second week, it sold an additional 93,000 copies and fell to number 13 on the Billboard chart., the album has sold 880,000 copies in the United States. On July 29, 2010, Battle Studies was certified platinum by the Recording Industry Association of America, for shipments of one million copies in the US.

Track listing
All songs written by John Mayer, except where noted.

Expanded edition
Battle Studies was later released in a CD/DVD "expanded edition", which added Mayer's VH1 Storytellers episode plus two intimate acoustic performances from his personal travels to Japan in May 2010. The DVD runs for approximately 50 minutes, and the track listing is as follows.

VH1 Storytellers
"No Such Thing"
"Daughters"
"Heartbreak Warfare"
"Your Body Is a Wonderland"
"Who Says"
"Waiting on the World to Change"
 "Half of My Heart"
  
A Trip to Japan Alone
<li>"Half of My Heart"
<li>"Who Says"

Personnel

Musicians
John Mayer – vocals; guitars; keyboards; sound effects; percussion; production; art direction; graphic design
Steve Jordan – drums on all tracks; percussion on tracks 5, 6, 8, 10 and 11; production
Pino Palladino – bass on all tracks except 2, 7 and 8
Sean Hurley – bass on tracks 2, 7 and 8
Ian McLagan – Hammond organ on tracks 5, 9 and 11; Wurlitzer electric piano on tracks 5 and 8; piano on tracks 10 and 11; pump organ and celeste on track 4
Jamie Muhoberac – keyboards on tracks 1 and 9
Robbie McIntosh – guitar on track 2
Waddy Wachtel – acoustic guitars on track 3
Bob Reynolds – saxophone on track 11
Bryan Lipps – trumpet on track 11
Taylor Swift – vocals on track 3

Production
Chad Franscoviak – engineering
Charlie Paakari – engineering assistance (Capitol Studios)
Justin Gerrish – engineering assistance (Avatar Studios); mixing assistance on track 10
Ghian Wright – engineering assistance (The Village Studios)
Martin Pradler – digital editing
Michael Brauer – mixing on tracks 1, 2, 4, 6 and 11
Ryan Gilligan – mixing assistance on tracks 1, 2, 4, 6 and 11
Manny Marroquin – mixing on tracks 3, 5, 7, 8 and 9
Erik Madrid – mixing assistance on tracks 3, 5, 7, 8 and 9
Christian Plata – mixing assistance on tracks 3, 5, 7, 8 and 9
Joe Ferla – mixing on track 10
Greg Calbi – mastering

Additional personnel
Jeri Heiden – art direction; graphic design
Albert Watson – photography
Gari Askew – photography
Carlos Hurtado – tracking
Roger Love – vocal consultant

Charts

Weekly charts

Year-end charts

Certifications

References

External links
 Official Battle Studies microsite
 Battle Studies at Discogs
 Battle Studies at Metacritic

2009 albums
John Mayer albums
Columbia Records albums
Albums recorded at Capitol Studios
Grammy Award for Best Engineered Album, Non-Classical